Muhammad Siddiq Al-Minshawi (– ), known simply as Al-Minshawi, was an Egyptian Quranic reciter and Hafiz. Al-Minshawi was born into a Quranic family, with his brother, father, grandfather become famous Qurra. Nicknamed Al-Saut Al-Baki, he is part of a quadrumvirate, along with Abdul Basit, Mustafa Ismail, and Al-Hussary, which are considered to be the most important and famous Qurra of modern times to have an outsized impact on the Islamic World.

History
Having been significantly influenced by his father, Al-Minshawi was also a protégé of Muhammad Rifat, Muhammad Salamah, famous reciters of the 20th century. He studied the rules of recitation under Ibrahim As-Su'oodi at a young age. He committed Qur'an to memory when he was 8 years old. He traveled to many countries outside of his homeland, including Indonesia, Jordan, Kuwait, Libya, Palestine (Al-Aqsa Mosque), Saudi Arabia, Pakistan and Syria.

Al-Minshawi also participated in recorded recitations with the two other reciters: Kamel al-Bahtimi and Fouad al-Aroussi. He helped children with the recitation of Quran. قران الكريم

Personal life

Al-Minshawi married two times, he had three boys and one girl with the first wife in addition to five boys and four girls with the second wife, but in 1968, his second wife died while on a pilgrimage.

Al-Minshawi belongs to a family of traditional Huffaz, Calligraphers, and Qaris; and like him, his father, Seddik Al Minshawy, and his brother, Mahmoud Al Minshawy, were professional Qurra, too. His son Mushaf Mulaim had also become a professional reciter teaching kids in the style of his father. He died on June 20, 1969 due to being afflicted by esophageal varices for a long period of his life.

Legacy 
Al Minshawi's recitations continue to be amongst the well known due to his impeccable Tajweed and style. He was the author of many books on various aspects of the Quran, and was also involved in the calligraphic printing of the Quranic text and “World of Islam festival”. His status as a Qari was lofty: He held the title Shaykh al-Maqâri, and his opinions were frequently solicited and quoted by the media. One can count a generation of younger reciters among his imitators. Al Minshawi also recited in the presence of many significant figures such as the Egyptian President Gamal Abdel Nasser in Syria's Umayyad Mosque in 1959. Abdel Nasser had also invited Sheikh al Minshawi to recite at the funeral of his father's death in Alexandria, 1968.

References

External links
Biographies of some professional reciters of the Qur'ân from Egypt

Egyptian Quran reciters
1920 births
1969 deaths